Bruce Wayne Ruffin (born October 4, 1963) is an American former professional baseball pitcher who played in Major League Baseball (MLB) for the Philadelphia Phillies (1986–91), Milwaukee Brewers (1992), and Colorado Rockies (1993–97).

Ruffin is a 1982 graduate of J. M. Hanks High School. While attending the University of Texas, Ruffin was a member of the 1983 National Champional Squad. He was selected in the second round (34th overall) of the 1985 Major League Baseball draft by the Philadelphia Phillies. Ruffin finished 7th in voting for the 1986 National League (NL) Rookie of the Year Award, with a 9-4 record and a 2.46 earned run average (ERA). He was promoted from the minor leagues to replace Steve Carlton in the Phillies' rotation after Carlton's release.

His son Chance was later a pitcher for the Seattle Mariners.

See also

 List of Major League Baseball single-inning strikeout leaders

References

External links

1963 births
Colorado Rockies players
Milwaukee Brewers players
Philadelphia Phillies players
Major League Baseball pitchers
Baseball players from Texas
Living people
Clearwater Phillies players
Reading Phillies players
Scranton/Wilkes-Barre Red Barons players
Denver Zephyrs players
New Haven Ravens players
Colorado Springs Sky Sox players
Texas Longhorns baseball players